Due to the absence of the tax code in Argentina,  the tax regulation takes place in accordance with separate laws, which, in turn, are supplemented by provisions of normative acts adopted by the executive authorities. The powers of the executive authority include levying a tax on profits, property and added value throughout the national territory. In Argentina, the tax policy is implemented by the Federal Administration of Public Revenue, which is subordinate to the Ministry of Economy. The Federal Administration of Public Revenues (AFIP) is an independent service, which includes: the General Tax Administration, the General Customs Office and the General Directorate for Social Security.
AFIP establishes the relevant legal norms for the calculation, payment and administration of taxes:
 taxes levied on operations carried out on the national territory of the country and in marine areas fully covered by the national tax policy;
 taxes, which are imposed on import and export operations, regulated by tax laws and customs regulations;
 corresponding deductions for social security.

The tax year is the fiscal year which can be calendar year or another period covering 12 months.
The administration of taxes functions on self-assessment system and the ruling is covered only by a binding consultation system. There is no ruling system for taxes in Argentina.

Taxes in Argentina

Taxes in Argentina are levied on three levels:

 federal level;
 provincial level;
 municipal level.

The main sources of state budget revenues in Argentina are:
 Income tax, levied both on enterprises and individuals;
 Value-added tax (VAT);
 Internal taxes.

The following federal taxes are applied in Argentina:
 Taxes on income, profit and capital gains: Income tax in Argentina is collected solely by the Government of Argentina, to the exclusion of the provinces. Argentina has a progressive tax on personal income that is collected as a deferred tax. It also has a flat rate tax on business income (corporate tax) - 35%. There is a stamp tax of 1.5% on the total value of real property, whether it gained or lost value, as opposed to just 1.5% applied only to realised capital gains. There is also an ad valorem property tax on other assets such as vehicles. There is also a 0.6% tax on all bank transactions.;
 VAT: The standard tax rate, currently 21%, is charged on the net price of the transaction. The special rate 27% is applied on services as water, natural, gas, power and communication services. Reduced rate of 10,5% is levied on some capital goods. Exports of goods and services are zero-taxed, because outputs are not with taxation and inputs can be reclaimed.;
 Excise taxes on electronics, tobacco, alcohol, soft drinks, perfumes, jewelry, precious stones, vehicles, tires, mobile phone services, insurance policies, gasoline, lubricating oils, and other items.;

 Taxes on property: The tax rate is set by the legislation of each province. The tax is paid monthly or every 2 months in accordance with the laws of a province.
 Taxes on foreign trade;

Regardless of the federal taxes in each separate Argentine province there are also taxes of the provincial level, :
 Tax on gross income;
 Real estate tax;
 Tax on vehicle fleet and vehicles;
 Turnover tax: Each of the 24 Argentine subjects has its own turnover tax rate. On average, turnover tax rate is approximately 3% to 5%, taxes for industrial activities are 1.5% to 4% and 1% to 3% for primary activities.
 Stamp Tax

The taxes based on provincial level are administered by the provincial revenue agencies.

In addition to the basic provincial taxes, each of the 24 subjects has, on average, three taxes (fees), unique to it. These fees are levied on individuals and legal entities for industrial safety services, health protection, environmental protection, advertising, airspace, quality control, sanitary inspection and electrical installations, etc.

In addition to the above taxes, set at the federal and provincial levels, in Argentina, the municipalities set a number of municipal fees: for lighting, garbage collection and other. The sums of municipal fees in fixed rates are determined in each particular municipality based on various conditions, for example, estimating the value of the property, its location, number of storeys, the year of construction, the condition of the roof, the materials of which it is made and others.

Argentina has agreements on avoidance of double taxation with countries such as Australia, Austria, Belgium, Bolivia, Brazil, Canada, Chile, Denmark, Finland, France, Germany, the Netherlands, Spain, Sweden, the United Kingdom and the United States. In October 2001, such an agreement was signed with Russia.

In Argentina, there are two modes of taxation, regulated by AFIP - general regime and simplified tax system. Taxpayers who are subject to taxation under the general regime are recognized as individuals or legal entities that pay the following taxes: profit tax, VAT, the minimum expected profit tax, personal property tax, and any other internal tax that is subject to collection and control by the Federal Administration of Public revenue. The essence of the simplified taxation is the establishment of a single tax consisting of two components: an integrated tax and a fixed amount. The integrated tax, is established on certain categories on basis of such indicators as:
 Gross income;
 The room space;
 Electricity consumption;
 Rent.
The application of the simplified taxation system by organizations provides for their exemption from the obligation to pay income tax, VAT, contributions to the Argentine pension system (SIPA), contributions to the National Health Insurance System.

Wage taxation in Argentina

Taxes connected to wages are consisted only from social security. There is no payroll tax in Argentina. The social security system is financed by employer contribution of 17% or 21% of payroll and 14% contribution by employee. The health care works the same but with 6% contribution by employer and 3% by employee. Self-employed individuals must pay their own contribution monthly and it is a fixed amount.

See also
 Administración Federal de Ingresos Públicos

References

External links 
 2009 tax guide
 Brief, partial list of taxes, World Bank Group
 Rige en Buenos Aires impuesto a la herencia (Spanish), Ambito.com, January 27, 2011

Argentina
Finance in Argentina